Viguier may refer to:

People 
 Camille Viguier (1850-1930), zoologist
 Jean-Paul Viguier (born 1946), French architect
 Louis Guillaume Alexandre Viguier (1790–1867, Vig.), botanist
 René Viguier (1880–1931, R.Vig.), botanist
 Sabrina Viguier (born 1981), French footballer

Government 
 The judge in charge of a Viguerie, a French lower court before the Revolution
 Title of the representative of French Co-Prince of Andorra until 1993 (the representative of the Episcopal Co-Prince was titled as Veguer)

External links